Göd is a small city in Pest County, Hungary.

Location 
The city is northeast of Budapest.

Economy
Göd has a thriving tourist trade. It has a thermal spa open almost 365 days a year with water rich in minerals.

Along the M2 motorway
Göd is the second town to the north of Budapest, and the first one without large socialist-era housing estates. That is, the green belt around Budapest starts with Göd on the left bank of the Danube.

The Samsung SDI Hungary plant is one of Samsung SDI's trio of advanced Lithium-ion automotive battery production facilities: the others are in Ulsan (Korea) and Xi'an (China). The plant at Göd is not far from the Austria-based battery pack division of Magna Steyr which was acquired by Samsung SDI in 2015 for $120 million. In 2016-2017, the Ulsan plant trained several employees for the Hungary plant. The Ulsan plant had supplied the BMW i3, but the Hungary plant will provide the BMW i3, i5, and X5 with advanced Li-ion batteries.

Infrastructure 
Göd is connected to Budapest (via Dunakeszi, southbound) and to Vác (via Sződliget, northbound) by railway and public roads. On an average weekday, there are buses and trains every 30 minutes to both directions. Vác is 15 minutes by car and by train, and 25 minutes by bus. Budapest Nyugati railway station is 30 minutes by train. Because of these benefits, Göd is sometimes categorized as a dormitory town, but it has a vivid social life: civil organizations, churches, galleries, clubs, a monthly newspaper, that make it different from an average dormitory town.

Gallery

Famous people 
 Eugene Wigner – physicist, Nobel-prize winner;
  – biologist, cancer researcher, founder of the Biology Research Centre of Göd;
 Fülöp Beck Ö – sculptor;
  – ballet-dancer;
 Kálmán Latabár – actor;
 Mór Kóczán – sportsman, athlete (javelin throw), Olympic bronze medalist, Hungarian champion;

 Zoltán Kammerer – sportsman (kayak), World Champion, European Champion, Olympic Gold winner;
 Colonel  – hero of the Hungarian Revolution of 1848;
 Gábor Koncz – actor;
 László Arany – poet (son of János Arany)

Twin towns – sister cities

Göd is twinned with:
 Marignane, France
 Monthey, Switzerland
 Paleu, Romania
 Yanoshi, Ukraine

Sport
The local sports and football team is Gödi SE.

References

External links

  in Hungarian

Populated places in Pest County